Heart Attacks and Callous Acts is the second release by Australian band The Hot Lies. The two radio play singles and video clips of this release are 'Promise Me' and 'Tell Me Goodnight'.  It was recorded, mixed and produced by Kalju Tonuma.

Track listing

Notes
"Tell Me Goodnight" was co-written by Dan Jones.
"Breakaway" is listed as "Break Away" in the lyric booklet; the correct spelling is listed above.

Charts

Personnel

Kalju Tonuma – producer, mixing, engineering
Peter Wood – vocals
Benjamin Pix – guitar, backing vocals
Josh Delsar – guitar
Leaton Rose – bass, backing vocals
Jared Brown – drums
Leon Zervos – mastering
Luke Postill – studio assistant
Travis Dempsey – drum tech
Dan Jones – pre-Production
Ian Miller – live sound
Tristan Checkley – stage technician
Damian Slevison – label manager
Craig Radcliffe – design, layout
Darren Reid – design, layout
David Solm – photography
Nat Thompson – photography

References

2005 EPs
The Hot Lies albums